The Rivière Salée (in its upper course: Rivière les Coulisses) is a river of Martinique. It flows into the Caribbean Sea near the town Rivière-Salée.

See also
List of rivers of Martinique

References
NOAA map

Rivers of Martinique
Rivers of France